Shurab-e Sofla (also Romanized as Shūrāb-e Soflá; also known as Shūrāb-e Pā’īn) is a village in Sang Bast Rural District, in the Central District of Fariman County, Razavi Khorasan Province, Iran. At the 2006 census, its population was 153, in 35 families.

References 

Populated places in Fariman County